Elachista maculosella is a moth of the family Elachistidae that is found in France, Germany and Italy.

References

maculosella
Moths described in 1896
Moths of Europe